Hà Nội 1956 Football Club., commonly referred to as Hà Nội ACB a.k.a. Tổng Cục Đường Sắt, was a Vietnamese football club based in Hanoi. They played in the V.League, which is the premier division in Vietnamese football. 
In the early years, Hanoi 1956 had name General Department of Railways, or Vietnam Railways, was a famous semi-professional football team in Vietnam from 1956 until its dissolution in 2000. The Hanoi-based club was placed under the management of the General Department of Railways, Vietnam Railways Administration. They won their first national championship at the 1980 Vietnam National Football Championship. Many of the team's players are now famous football coaches in Vietnam, including Le Thuy Hai, Mai Duc Chung, Le Khac Chinh...

The club was dissolved before the start of the 2013 season. In 2008 they won the Vietnamese Cup and went on playing in the 2009 AFC Cup, reaching the group stages of the competition. After Hà Nội ACB was relegated from the V-League in 2011, they bought V-League side Hòa Phát Hà Nội and merged both sides to become the new Hanoi F.C., which eventually dissolved later in 2012.

History

Tổng cục Đường sắt period

The football club of the General Department of Railways was established in 1956, became one of the first established football clubs in North Vietnam in general and in Hanoi in particular. During the war, the club was famous nationwide, second only to The Cong in terms of achievements and the level of fans' admiration.
On November 7, 1976, as the top team representing North Vietnam, they had a historic match against the top team representing South Vietnam at that time, Cang Sai Gon. 
In 1980, the club became the champion of the first A1 National Football Championship. The Cong, the strongest team in Vietnam, withdrew from playing in this tournament.
In the 1985 season, the team failed to compete, ranked last in the reverse final round, and had to be relegated to A2 division.
In 1989, the General Department of Railways was dissolved, transformed into a State Enterprise with the name Vietnam Railway Union, operating on the principle of open market. The team was also renamed the Vietnam Railway Football Team, but the fans still used to calling it the General Department of Railways team.

In the period of the market economy, the team faced many difficulties in maintaining. In the early 2000s, the title of Vietnam Railway Football Team was dissolved, the whole team was transferred to Asia Bank to manage under the new name Á Châu Bank Football Club or Hanoi ACB, which was managed by ACB Sports Joint Stock Company.

Hà Nội ACB period

Although it was a team with high achievements, but after many years of decline, the transferred force of Vietnam Railways was relatively weak. In order to regain the old strength, in addition to the reorganization, the team also cooperated with Song Lam Nghe An to build a force of young players.

After 2 years of investment, the team officially claimed the right to compete in the Vietnam National Football Championship V-League 2001-2002 and moved its headquarters to Hanoi. The team is also sponsored by LG Electronic, hence the name LG.ACB Football Club.

However, in the 2003 season, the team failed to play and fell back to the First Division. Also during the season, the Vietnam Airlines Corporation (which had just taken over the traditional football team of Hanoi Police) also announced that it would stop sponsoring the Vietnam Airlines Football Club because of a lack of funding. Despite not being sponsored, the club still managed to compete in the 2004 Vietnam National Football Championship. After that, ACB Sports Joint Stock Company has taken over the entire force of Vietnam Airlines FC. Most of the main players of the Vietnam Aviation team became the core of the new team called LG. Hanoi ACB, competing in the professional division V-League. The remaining personnel were gathered by the Hanoi Football Federation to form a semi-professional football team and sponsored by Hoa Phat Group, competing in the First Division under the name Hòa Phát Hà Nội. .

In the middle of the 2006 season, LG withdrew its sponsorship, the club was renamed Hanoi - ACB. Also during this year, the Hòa Phát Hà Nội also officially switched to the professional model and competed in the V-League.

As a result of the lack of sponsorship, in 2008, both teams were unsuccessful and had to relegate to the First Division. In the 2009 football season, Hòa Phát Hà Nội managed to win promotion and the following year, the team once again played in the V-League after winning the 2010 First Division championship.

However, the 2011 season was an unlucky season, when the team finished bottom of the table and fell back to the First Division. At the end of 2011, the team's management unit, ACB Sports Joint Stock Company, took over Hòa Phát Hà Nội. Once again, there was a big change in personnel when most of Hòa Phát Hà Nội's squad was kept in the official squad to play in the league with the old Hòa Phát Hà Nội position with the new name Hanoi Football club or Hanoi 1956. Most of the old Hanoi ACB squad was transferred to the 2nd squad with the new name of Hanoi Youth Football Club and played in the First Division (second highest division in Vietnam behind V-League.

At the end of the 2012 season, the team ranked 9th in the league table. However, after the manager Nguyen Duc Kien was arrested, the team fell into a crisis. The club's leaders decided not to register for the 2013 V-League and also withdrew the name Hanoi Youth from the list of next year's First Division. This means that the professional club will no longer participate in football life.

Names
 Câu lạc bộ bóng đá Ngân hàng Á Châu (2000-2001)
 Câu lạc bộ bóng đá LG.ACB (2002-2003)
 Câu lạc bộ bóng đá LG.Hà Nội.ACB (2003-2006)
 Câu lạc bộ bóng đá Hà Nội - ACB (2006-2011)
 Câu lạc bộ bóng đá Hà Nội (2012)

Honours

National competitions
League
V.League 1 / A1 National League:
 Winners (1) :   1980
V.League 2:
 Winners :      2010
 Runners-up : 2004, 2009
Cup
Vietnamese Cup:
 Winners :      2008
Vietnamese Super Cup:
 Runners-up : 2008

Performance in AFC competitions
AFC Cup: 1 appearance
2009: Group stage

Season-by-season record

References

Hà Nội FC
Football clubs in Vietnam
Football clubs in Hanoi
Association football clubs established in 1956
Association football clubs disestablished in 2012
1956 establishments in Vietnam
2012 disestablishments in Vietnam